Nuclear latency or a nuclear threshold state is the condition of a country possessing the technology to quickly build nuclear weapons, without having actually yet done so. Because such latent capability is not proscribed by the Nuclear Non-Proliferation Treaty, this is sometimes called the "Japan Option" (as a work-around to the treaty), as Japan is considered a "paranuclear" state, being a clear case of a country with complete technical prowess to develop a nuclear weapon quickly, or as it is sometimes called "being one screwdriver's turn" from the bomb, as Japan is considered to have the materials, expertise and technical capacity to make a nuclear bomb at will. However, nuclear latency does not presume any particular intentions on the part of a state recognized as being nuclear-latent.

Nuclear hedging 
It is worth noting that while nuclear latency can be achieved with solely peaceful intentions, this may not always be the case. These cases in which nuclear latency is achieved for the purposes of having the potential to create nuclear arms in the future are known as nuclear hedging. While states engaging in nuclear hedging do not directly violate the NPT, they do run the risk of potentially encouraging their neighboring states, particularly those they have had conflicts with, to do the same, spawning a “virtual” arms race to ensure the potential of future nuclear capability. Such a situation could rapidly escalate into an actual arms race, drastically raising tensions in the region and increasing the risk of a potential nuclear exchange.

Determining peacefulness of a nuclear program 
In a paper written following the establishment of the JCPOA, a Counselor of the Nuclear Threat Initiative, John Carlson, outlined several criteria for use in helping to determine whether a state’s nuclear program was run solely with peaceful intentions, or if the state was engaging in nuclear hedging:

1. Production of nuclear materials significantly beyond what could feasibly be needed in order to maintain a state’s current nuclear reactors. This includes both the processes of the enrichment of uranium and the reprocessing of plutonium.

2. Retaining stores of nuclear materials which can be used in weapons construction beyond the amount that could reasonably be slated for use in civilian purposes, such as research or power generation.

3. Noncompliance or lack of proper cooperation with the IAEA, or grievous disregard for reasonable safeguards.

4. Construction of facilities and infrastructure which is more reasonably oriented toward the production of nuclear weapons than for civil purposes, such as reactors that produce extremely large quantities of plutonium.

5. Production of technologies which are primarily oriented toward the creation of nuclear weapons, such as the explosive lenses required to build an implosion-type weapon.

6. Production or development of systems designed to allow for the deliverance of nuclear payloads, such as long-range ballistic missiles.

7. A supposedly civilian nuclear energy program having heavy involvement with the state’s military, an indication that the state’s military is likely seeking to obtain nuclear materials.

8. Making use of black market sources in order to obtain nuclear materials, technology used for reprocessing or enrichment, technology used in the production of nuclear arms or delivery systems, or the purchase of nuclear delivery systems outright.

9. The state being in a location in which it has a history of severe conflicts in its relationships with several neighboring states. This gives the state a reason to desire nuclear arms as a potential deterrence of its neighboring adversaries.

Nuclear-latent powers
There are many countries capable of producing nuclear weapons, or at least enriching uranium or manufacturing plutonium. Among the most notable are Japan, Canada, Germany, The Netherlands, and Australia. In addition, South Africa has successfully developed its own nuclear weapons, but dismantled them in 1989. Following the Joint Comprehensive Plan of Action agreement some consider Iran a nuclear threshold state. Taiwan and South Korea have both been identified as "insecure" nuclear threshold states—states with the technical capability to develop nuclear weapons and the security motivations to seriously contemplate such an option—since the publishing of a Mitre Corporation report in 1977. US intelligence also believes Taiwan has designed devices suitable for nuclear testing. 

The number of states that are technically nuclear-latent has steadily increased as nuclear energy and its requisite technologies have become more available to a variety of states.

References

Additional Resources
For more on the proliferation and debates surrounding nuclear weapons and their latency, visit the Woodrow Wilson Center's Nuclear Proliferation International History Project website: http://wilsoncenter.org/program/nuclear-proliferation-international-history-project.

Nuclear weapons